Dead Right may refer to:
 Dead Right (novel), a 1997 novel by Peter Robinson
 Dead Right (film), a 1993 short film by Edgar Wright
 "Dead Right", episode S02E01 of Tales from the Crypt